Bivagina is a genus of monogeneans. As all Monogenea, species in the genus are ectoparasites that affect their host by attaching themselves as larvae on the gills of fish and grow into adult stage. This larval stage is called oncomiracidium, and is characterized as free swimming and ciliated.

Taxonomy
This genus was proposed by Yamaguti in 1963 to accommodate Bivagina tai, Bivagina alcedinis, Bivagina australis, Bivagina baumi and 'Bivagina sillaginae, previously included in the genus Microcotyle.  

Description
Members of the genus Bivagina'' are characterised by a symmetrical haptor, a few testes, a cirrus and/or genital atrium unarmed and two vaginal pores armed or unarmed.

Species
Currently ten species are recognized:

References

Microcotylidae
Monogenea genera